Legler is a surname. It may refer to:

Casey Legler (born 1977), French female Olympic swimmer and model of men's cloths
David Legler, record winning contestant on Twenty One game show
George Phar Legler, early 20th century creator of the Valley of the Moon (Tucson, Arizona) children's fantasy park
Henry Eduard Legler (1861–1917), Italian-American journalist, politician, and librarian
John M. Legler, herpetologist and namesake of Legler's stream frog
Julie Legler, American biostatistician and statistics educator
Laurel Legler, producer of Detroit rock documentary MC5: A True Testimonial
Matthias Legler, East German bobsledder
Ron Legler, founder of Pulse nightclub
Tim Legler (born 1966), American basketball player

de:Legler